Acme is a patience or card solitaire of the reserved packer type using a single deck of playing cards.

History 
Acme is an old patience whose rules are first recorded by "Tarbart" in 1905.

Rules

Acme has four tableau locations or depots initially of one card each, and they are built down in suit.  There are also four foundations that build up in suit.  The reserve pile contains 13 cards which can be played onto the foundations or tableau. The player turns up one card at a time from the talon, the cards remaining in his or her hand.

Only the top card of a depot can be moved. These cards can be moved to a foundation or onto another depot.  The tableau builds down in suit, and the foundations build up in suit.  Cards from the reserve automatically fill any vacancies in the tableau. Any card can fill a vacancy after the reserve is exhausted. There is only one redeal allowed in this game, so only two passes through the deck are allowed.

Strategy: Rather than using the cards from the deck, a player should try to use all of the reserve cards first.  Only two passes are allowed, so the deck should be used wisely.

Variations
In the variation Acme II, the whole of each tableau pile may be moved rather than just the top card.

References

Bibliography 
 "Tarbart" (1905). Games of Patience. 2nd edn. De La Rue.

External links 
 Acme Solitaire Rules, Solitaire Central, Accessed 14 October 2020.

See also
 Canfield 
 List of patiences and solitaires
 Glossary of patience and solitaire terms

Single-deck patience card games
Reserved packers